Qaleh-ye Khvajeh (also Romanized as Qal‘eh-ye Khvājeh, Qal‘eh Khvājeh, and Qal’eh Khājeh; also known as Qal‘eh-ye Khvājeh Bālā) is a city and capital of Andika County, Khuzestan Province, Iran.  At the 2006 census, its population was 801, in 179 families.

References

Populated places in Andika County

Cities in Khuzestan Province